Herbert Da Costa Edmondson was an Anglican Bishop of Jamaica in the final quarter of the 20th century.

He was educated at St Peter's College, Jamaica, and London University and ordained in 1950. His first post was in  Manchester Parish after which he was Director of Anglican Schools for the Diocese of Jamaica and then suffragan bishop (Bishop of Mandeville. In 1975, he was promoted to be that diocese's bishop diocesan, the Bishop of Jamaica, serving for four years.

References

Alumni of the University of London
20th-century Anglican bishops in the Caribbean
Anglican bishops of Jamaica